Pierre Silvain (1926 in Morocco – 30 October 2009) was a French writer and playwright.

Works 
1960: La Part de l'ombre, novel, Plon
1963: La Chair et l'ombre, novel, Plon
1964: L'Air et la chanson, novel, Plon
1965: La Dame d'Elche, novel, Mercure de France
1966: La Fenêtre, novel, Mercure de France
1968: Zacharie Blue, novel, Mercure de France
1969: La promenade en barque, novel, Mercure de France
1971: Mélodrame, theatre, Éditions Gallimard
1971: Les Eoliennes, novel, Mercure de France
1973: Le Grand Théâtre, novel, Mercure de France
1977: Les Espaces brûlés, tale, Mercure de France
1983: Une douleur d'amour, novel, Fayard
1985: L'empire fortuné, novel, ed. Manya
1985: Le regard du serpent, novel, ed. Mazarine
1990: Le Guetteur invisible", récit illustré de photographies de Pierre Schwartz, ed. Noésis
1992: Les chemins de la terre, proses, éd. Rougerie
1994: Détours, proses, éd. Rougerie
1995: La gloire éphémère de Joao Matos, novel, Julliard.
1998: Petites proses voyageuses", with illustrations by Colette Deblé, ed. Cadex
1998: Dans la nuit de Médée, novel, éd. Hors Commerce
2000: Le Brasier, le fleuve, essay, « L’un et l’autre », Éditions Gallimard
2002: Les Chiens du vent, poetry, with inks by Jean-Claude Pirotte, ed. Cadex
2002: Le Jardin des retours, 
2005: Le Côté de Balbec, essay, L’Escampette
2007: Julien Letrouvé, colporteur, Verdier, (Prix de la Ville de Caen, 2008)
2007: Passage de la morte - Pierre Jean Jouve, essay, L'Escampette Éditions 
2009: Assise devant la mer, Verdier
2010: Les Couleurs d’un hiver, Éditions Verdier

External links 
 Articles about Pierre Silvain on Remue.net
 Pierre Silvain on Editions Verdier
 Notice on BiblioObs
 Obituary on Mediapart

20th-century French novelists
21st-century French novelists
20th-century French dramatists and playwrights
1926 births
2009 deaths
20th-century French essayists